Bhagwan Das KabirPanthi is MLA of Bharatiya Janta Party from Nilokheri, Haryana.

References

External links

People from Rewari district
Bharatiya Janata Party politicians from Haryana
Members of the Haryana Legislative Assembly
Living people
21st-century Indian politicians
Year of birth missing (living people)